François Georges Auguste Dauverné (16 February 1799 – 4 November 1874) was a French trumpeter who in 1827 was the first to use the new F three-valved trumpet in public performance. Dauverné was amongst the first to realise the potential of the newly invented valve trumpet after the arrival of a specimen, sent by Spontini from Prussia to Paris in 1826, and is credited with persuading several composers to write for it, the first three being Chélard (Macbeth, 1827), Berlioz (Waverley Overture, 1827) and Rossini (Guillaume Tell, 1829) .

Aged 15 he entered the  Musique des Gardes-du-Corps du Roi as trumpeter and was later first trumpeter in the orchestra of the Academie Royale de Musique. In 1833 he became the first trumpet teacher at the Conservatoire de Paris teaching both valved trumpet and natural trumpet where his most famous student was Jean-Baptiste Arban .

François Dauverné retired from teaching on 1 January 1859  and died in Paris on 4 November 1874.

References
  Edward H. Tarr, Die Trompete, 4th edition 2005
  
  Article by D. Kelly, ITG Journal, March 2006 (pages 17–28)
  Bryan Proksch, “Buhl, Dauverné, Kresser, and the Trumpet in Paris c. 1800–1840,” Historic Brass Society Journal 20 (2008), 69–91.

External links 
Article on Francois Dauverne
Proksch article on Dauverne
 Publication :
 "Variations" op. 3 pour Trompette (ou cornet) et Piano. Doblinger, Wien. http://www.doblinger-musikverlag.at/Neuersch/index.php?sp=2&kat=1 

1799 births
1874 deaths
Musicians from Paris
French classical trumpeters
Male trumpeters
Academic staff of the Conservatoire de Paris
19th-century classical musicians
19th-century male musicians